Blarney is a 1926 American silent melodrama directed by Marcel De Sano, and starring Ralph Graves, Paulette Duval, and Renée Adorée. The film is based on the short story "In Praise of John Carabine", by Brian Oswald Donn-Byrne.

Plot
James (Ralph Graves), an Irish prizefighter, becomes involved with two New York girls.

Cast
 Renée Adorée - Peggy Nolan
 Ralph Graves - James Carabine
 Paulette Duval - Marcolina
 Malcolm Waite - Blanco Johnson
 Margaret Seddon - Peggy's Aunt

References

External links

1926 films
1925 drama films
1925 films
Silent American drama films
American silent feature films
American black-and-white films
American boxing films
Films about Irish-American culture
Films based on short fiction
Films set in New York City
Metro-Goldwyn-Mayer films
Melodrama films
1926 drama films
Films directed by Marcel De Sano
1920s American films